Dashiell A. Snow (July 27, 1981 – July 13, 2009) was an American artist based in New York City. Snow's photographs included scenes of sex, drugs, violence, and art-world pretense; his work often depicted the decadent lifestyle of young New York City artists and their social circle.

Early life and education
Dashiell A. Snow was born July 27, 1981 to Taya Thurman and Christopher Snow. He grew up on the Upper West Side in New York City. Snow and his siblings, Maxwell and Caroline, are descendants of the de Menil family, who are known for their philanthropy and collection of American art.

At thirteen, he was admitted to Hidden Lake Academy, a residential treatment center specializing in the treatment of children with oppositional defiant disorder.

Career 
As a teenager, Snow began taking photographs to document the places he might not remember the next day. In the 1990s, he was a member of the IRAK graffiti crew; the name of the group was meant to reference shoplifting, or otherwise called, racking. In order to sign his work, Snow used the tag "SACE" or "SACER".

His first solo photography exhibition took place in 2005.

In 2006, The Wall Street Journal profiled Snow and nine other emerging American artists, including Rosson Crow, Ryan Trecartin, Zane Lewis, Barney Kulok, Jordan Wolfson, and Keegan McHargue. The same year he was included in the Whitney Biennial.

In 2007, Snow and Dan Colen co-created an installation of shredded phone books in Jeffrey Deitch's SoHo gallery; the exhibit was named “Nest” or “Hamster Nest”.

In his later collage-based work, Snow used his semen as a material applied to or splashed across newspaper photographs of police officers and/or other authority figures.

Family and personal life
Snow's parents were Christopher Snow and Taya Thurman. His maternal grandparents were Buddhist scholar Robert Thurman, the father of actress Uma Thurman, and artist Marie-Christophe de Menil. He was the great-grandson of John de Menil and Dominique de Menil, the founders of the Menil Collection and Museum located in Houston, Texas.

At the age of 18, Snow married Corsican artist Agathe Aparru Snow; the couple later divorced.

In July 2007, his partner, Jade Berreau, gave birth to the couple's daughter, Secret Midnight Magic Nico.

Death and legacy
On July 13, 2009, Snow died of a drug overdose while a guest of Lafayette House in New York City.

In 2016, his family sued McDonald's after they refused to remove the tag "SACE" from the graffiti-themed interior design used in some European and Asian restaurants; the case was later dismissed.

A documentary film about Snow, Moments Like This Never Last, was released in 2020.

Publications
Slime The Boogie. Berlin/Los Angeles: Peres Projects, 2007.
Gang bang at ground zero. New York City: self-published, 2007. Zine. Produced in collaboration with Christopher Snow.
You Can't Drink It If It's Frozen: the Dash Snow Purple Book. 2007. Olivier Zahm, Purple Fashion Magazine, and Janvier, 2007.
The End of Living, the Beginning of Survival. Berlin: Contemporary Fine Arts, 2007. .
I'd rather drink muddy water, and sleep in a hollow log. Self-published / Contemporary Fine Arts Berlin, 2007. . Includes "Skeletal love" by Raina Hammer.
God Spoiled a Perfect Asshole When He Put Teeth in Yer Mouth. Berlin/Los Angeles: Peres Projects Holdings, 2007. . Published on the occasion of an exhibition at Peres Projects, Los Angeles.
Nest. New York City: Deitch Projects, 2008. With Dan Colen. . Published on the occasion of an exhibition at Deitch Projects, New York City, 2007.
In the Softest Grey Petals of the Bomb, Lay Your Finger Across my Lips. Los Angeles: Peres Projects, 2009. .
Polaroids. Berlin/Los Angeles: Peres Projects, 2009. .
I love you, stupid!. New York City: D.A.P., 2012. . Cologne: Walther König, 2013. .
Love Roses. New York City: Karma, 2015. .
Selected Works From 2001 To 2009. Zurich: Nieves; Geneva: Innen, 2014.
Second edition. Zurich: Nieves; Geneva: Innen, 2020. .

Exhibitions

Solo exhibitions
Silence is the only true friend that shall never betray you, Rivington Arms, New York City, 2006. Collages.
Rivington Arms, New York City, 2006. Found materials, collages, sculptures and assemblages.

Group exhibitions
USA Today, Royal Academy, London, 2006
Whitney Biennial, Whitney Museum of American Art, New York City, 2006
Babylon: Myth and Truth, Pergamon Museum, Berlin, 2008. Included collages by Snow.
Exercises on Democracy, a traveling exhibition, White House Biennial, Athens, Greece, 2013–
Materialized: New Ameriacn Video and..., Bergen Kunsthall, Norway, 2008. Included Hamsters Nest by Snow. Curated by Kathy Grayson.
Photographs. The Royal Collection of Graphic Arts, National Gallery of Denmark, Denmark, 2010

Collections
Snow's work is held in the following public collections:
Whitney Museum of American Art, New York City
Brooklyn Museum, New York City
The Watermill Center

See also
27 Club

References

External links 
 Dash Snow Interview in Interview magazine
 Denis Kovalev, "Dash Snow", Sgustok Magazine, 2010
 Peres Projects, Berlin Los Angeles
Dash Snow Appearing in Graf Core 2000

Culture of New York City
American graffiti artists
Deaths by heroin overdose in New York (state)
20th-century American photographers
1981 births
2009 deaths
Artists from New York (state)
20th-century American painters
American male painters
Drug-related deaths in New York City
20th-century American male artists